Hjörtur Logi Valgarðsson (born 27 September 1988) is an Icelandic professional footballer who plays as a defender for FH Hafnarfjörður.

Club career
He made his debut with FH Hafnarfjörður when he was 18 years old in 2006 and was from the season 2008 a key player for the club.

Logi signed with Swedish club IFK Göteborg on 18 January 2011 after having been on trial with them in December 2010.

Logi signed with Norwegian side Sogndal ahead of the 2014 season, where he was re-united with his previous manager from IFK Göteborg, Jonas Olsson.

International career
On 18 June 2011, Logi scored his first goal for Iceland U21 in the 3–1 win against Denmark U21 at the 2011 UEFA European Under-21 Football Championship. He made his debut with the Icelandic national team against Faroe Islands on 15 March 2008.

Honours

Club
IFK Göteborg
Svenska Cupen: 2012–13

References

External links

Hjörtur Logi Valgarðsson at Melar Sport homepage

1988 births
Living people
Hjortur Logi Valgardsson
Hjortur Logi Valgardsson
Hjortur Logi Valgardsson
Hjortur Logi Valgardsson
Hjortur Logi Valgardsson
Hjortur Logi Valgardsson
Hjortur Logi Valgardsson
IFK Göteborg players
Sogndal Fotball players
Örebro SK players
Allsvenskan players
Eliteserien players
Hjortur Logi Valgardsson
Expatriate footballers in Sweden
Hjortur Logi Valgardsson
Expatriate footballers in Norway
Hjortur Logi Valgardsson
Association football defenders